Juraj II Drašković (5 February 1525 – 31 January 1587) was a Croatian nobleman, statesman and Catholic bishop and cardinal, very powerful and influential in the Croatian Kingdom. He was a member of the Drašković noble family and elected by the Sabor – the Parliament of Croatia – as Ban (viceroy) of Croatia to oversee the country between 1567 and 1578.

Early life

Juraj Drašković was born at Bilina near Knin (southern Croatia), the eldest son of Bartol /Bartholomew/ Drašković (*c.1500; †1538) and his wife Ana née Utješinović, a sister of cardinal Juraj Utješinović /George Utissenich alias George Martinuzzi/ (*1482; †1551), bishop of Oradea and archbishop of Esztergom. Having lived in turbulent and dangerous times of Ottoman invasion, Bartol's family moved from southern Croatia to Karlovac region in the west part of the country. During Juraj's childhood, his father died and he was raised by his mother and his influential uncle Utješinović. He was schooled for priesthood in Krakow (Poland) and Vienna (Austria). In 1550 he went to study law in Padova (Italy).

Drašković started his career as provost in Arad (Romania) and after that in Jasov (today in Slovakia). In 1553 he was appointed secretary of the Holy Roman Emperor and Croato-Hungarian king Ferdinand I of Habsburg and in 1555 he took over the prepositure of Pozsony (present day Bratislava, Slovakia). On 22 April 1557, Drašković became bishop of Pécs in southern Hungary and in 1563 he took over the bishop's chair in Zagreb, the capital of the Kingdom of Croatia within the Habsburg monarchy, where he stayed until 1578.

Ban of Croatia
In the meantime he was in 1567 chosen to be Ban of Croatia, together with knez (duke) Franjo Frankopan Slunjski, a member of Frankopan noble family. After Frankopan's death on 2 December 1572, Drašković reigned alone until 1574 and together with co-Ban Gáspár Alapi, former deputy viceroy, after that. During his reign, political and social situation in Croatia was extremely complicated, marked by Ottoman invasion, noblemen conflicts, Protestantism breakthrough and peasant revolts.

Peasant revolt
Drašković believed in maintaining the harsh feudal system and was against the end of serfdom, a practice similar to slavery, the Bishop himself held great estates and owned thousands of serfs, to prevent the Krajina example where Orthodox peasants had been freed by the Habsburgs in exchange by lifelong military service defending the borders,  Drašković took a leading role in crushing the peasant revolt of 1573 led by Ambroz "Matija" Gubec. Drašković led the army of the nobility against the poorly armed peasant army, it is estimated that four to six thousand serfs were killed with the bodies of hundreds of them left hanging from trees across villages as a deterrent, Gubec was taken prisoner and brought to Zagreb where he was found guilty of treason.
The Bishop deliberately spread rumours that Matija Gubec had been elected king by his co-conspirators, to set an example to any possible future rebels, the bishop had Gubec tortured in front of St. Mark' s Church in Zagreb and then forced to wear a red-hot iron crown as “king of the peasants” before being dismembered by four horses. In a letter to King Maximilian Drašković demanded permission to crown Gubec publicly with an iron crown. 

However, he was known as wise theologian and politician, who was always in the right place at the right time, settling most of troubles.

Later life
In 1574 Drašković was appointed archbishop of Kalocsa (Hungary), retaining the rule of Diocese of Zagreb. In 1578 he moved to Diocese of Győr and became at the same time the royal chancellor. Emperor and king Rudolf II of Habsburg promoted him and made him the royal governor of Hungary (1584), which is a title equal to Hungarian palatine.

Drašković became cardinal at the first consistory of Pope Sixtus V on 18 December 1585. On his way to Rome he suddenly died in Vienna on 31 January 1587, at the age of 61. He was buried in the Cathedral of Blessed Virgin Mary in Győr.

See also

Roman Catholic Archdiocese of Zagreb
Ban of Croatia
House of Drašković
Croatian nobility
Croatian–Slovene Peasant Revolt

References

 Ivan Hojsak: "Rodoslovlje obitelji Drašković" ("Genealogy of the Drašković family"),  Varaždin 2004,

External links
Viceroy and cardinal Juraj Drašković in the „History of Croatia“ by PhD Rudolf Horvat, Croatian historian
Juraj Drašković in „The Ottoman threat, noble displacees and Croatian identity“ by Ivan Jurković from the Faculty of philosophy in Pula
Short biography
Portrait of Juraj Drašković

Archbishops of Kalocsa
Croatian cardinals
Bishops of Zagreb
Bans of Croatia
Drašković family
16th-century Croatian people
Habsburg Croats
1525 births
1587 deaths
Bishops of Pécs
16th-century Croatian nobility